The Extraordinary Journey of Celeste Garcia is a German-Cuban comedy written and directed by Arturo Infante. The film premiered on 7 September 2018 in the Discovery programme of the 2018 Toronto International Film Festival.

Plot

Celeste Garcia is a 60-year-old Cuban who lives in present-day Havana, where hopes of a brighter future have abandoned her. Her steady and predictable life as a guide at the local planetarium and mother of 25-year-old Pedrito is turned upside down when friendly extraterrestrial aliens make contact with earth and invite citizens from all over the world to travel to their unknown but incredible planet. Celeste is one of the few to be invited and, to everyone's disbelief, she decides to embark on this extraordinary journey. But how many light years should you travel to find happiness?

Cast
 María Isabel Díaz Lago as Celeste
 Omar Franco as Augusto
 Néstor Jiménez as Hector Francisco
 Yerlín Pérez as Perlita 
 Tamara Castellanos as Mirta
 Veronica Diaz as Zobeida
 Roberto Espinosa as Pedrito
 Reinier Díaz as Yunier
 Andrea Doimeadios as Malu
 Beatriz Viña as Luisa

Awards
In 2019 The Extraordinary Journey of Celeste Garcia won first prize in the New Directors Competition at the Seattle International Film Festival.

References

External links
 

2018 films
Cuban comedy films
German comedy films
2010s Spanish-language films
Films about extraterrestrial life
2018 comedy films
2010s German films